Ephedra sinica (also known as Chinese ephedra or Ma Huang) is a species of Ephedra native to Mongolia, Russia (Buryatiya, Chita, Primorye), and northeastern China (Gansu, Hebei, Heilongjiang, Jilin, Liaoning, Nei Mongol, Ningxia, Shaanxi, Shanxi).

Uses

Medicinal

It is the primary source of the medicinal preparation ephedra, also known by its Chinese name ma huang. It has been proposed as a candidate for the legendary soma of the Rigveda.

See also
 Chinese medicine
 Ephedra (the genus of plants)
 Ephedra (US-specific page on ephedrine-containing dietary supplements, observed (negative) health effects of these, and corresponding regulatory actions toward them)
 List of herbs with known adverse effects

References

sinica
Flora of temperate Asia
Plants described in 1927
Traditional Chinese medicine
Medicinal plants
Soma (drink)